Blankenese High Lighthouse (also known as Blankenese Upper Lighthouse) was a lighthouse on the river Elbe in the Hamburg district of Blankenese, from 1984 to 2020.

Description 
Blankenese High Lighthouse and Blankenese Low Lighthouse form a range of lights for ships sailing upriver on the Elbe. With a range of 8.4 kilometers, they have the longest range on the Unterelbe.

The Blankenese High Lighthouse was 40-meters tall, white-and-red-striped concrete tower with a red steel lantern house was constructed in 1983. It is located in Baurs Park on the Kanonenberg, approximately 1,340 meters from the low light. Inside it has a round staircase leading to the top. Because of its height, the tower has an obstacle lighting for air transport.

The eleven-ton lantern house was assembled using a mobile crane. The range of lights went operational on 29 November 1984.

The lighthouse was remotely controlled by the Seemanshöft Pilot Centre.

Replacement 
Due to adjustments to the Elbe fairway, both the High and the Low Lighthouses were replaced to a similar 62.25 m high at Mühlenberg and demolished.

See also 
 List of lighthouses and lightvessels in Germany

References

External links 
 
 Data and images at leuchtturm-atlas.de 
 Data at leuchtturm-web.de 
 Description at leuchttuerme.net 
 Images and description 

Lighthouses in Hamburg
Buildings and structures in Altona, Hamburg